Seo Sang-won (November 11, 1967) is a South Korean actor. He has appeared in supporting roles in various films and television dramas, but is better known for his work as a stage actor. His most known works in television series are Record of Youth (2020) and Hometown Cha-Cha-Cha (2021).

Career 
In 1992, Seo begin his acting career as member Theatre Company Michu. Seo took part in many important play of the company such as General Oh’s Claw by Park Jo-yeol and Namsadang Sky. He was a member from 1992 to 2001.

In 2001 he became member of National Theater Company of Korea. In the same year he took part in stage play Shakespeare's Hamlet, one of the most loved repertoires in the world of performing arts. His roles were nobleman, Norwegian soldier, and Guildenstern.

After six years, he finally got lead role as Hamlet in Terrorist Hamlet (2007), a collaboration between National Theater Company of Korea and German director Jens-Daniel Herzog. He was former Artistic Director of the Mannheim National Theater and considered to be the next-generation director of German contemporary theater. Adaptation of the script were written by Kim Min-hye and Johannes Kirsten. It was premiered as NTCK Regular Performance The 209th World Masterpiece Stage.

In the play, Hamlet appears as an unfamiliar figure in jeans and a pistol in hand, and Claudius who ascended the throne after killing the previous king, is portrayed as a democratic figure representing the new era. For his performance as Hamlet, Seo received the best actor award from 2008 Korean Drama Awards and a 2008 Commendation from the Minister of Culture, Sports and Tourism.

A year later, the National Theater Company of Korea and German director Jens-Daniel Herzog collaborated again in Terrorist Hamlet (2008) for NTCK Regular Performance The 210th World Masterpiece Stage.

Two years later, Seo was rewarded 2010 Commendation from the Minister of Culture, Sports and Tourism, but didn’t attend the ceremony.

His first television appearance was minor role as Pastor in drama Prison Playbook (2017). After that he took mostly minor and supporting roles because his focus still in his theater works. In 2019 he appear in movie Lucky Chan-sil as cameo.

Filmography

Film

Television

Stage

Theater

Accolades

Award

State honors

It was said that he was nominated again in 2010 but refused to accept it.

Notes

References

External links 
 
 
 playDB Seo Sang-won

1967 births
Living people
21st-century South Korean male actors
Male actors from Seoul
South Korean male actors
South Korean male film actors
South Korean male musical theatre actors
South Korean male stage actors
South Korean male television actors